American actress Ashley Tisdale has appeared in many motion pictures and television programs since starting her career in 1988. Tisdale made her acting debut at age 12 with small roles in the 1997 television series Smart Guy and 7th Heaven. A year later, she had her first voice role in the feature film A Bug's Life. In the following years, she had small roles in television shows such as Beverly Hills, 90210 (2000), The Amanda Show (2000), Charmed (1998) in the third season (episode 21), as a runaway teen, The Hughleys (2002), Still Standing (2003) and Boston Public (2000). Her performance in the last earned her a Young Artist Award nomination for "Best Performance in a Television Drama Series." She was eventually cast in her first main role in Disney Channel's The Suite Life of Zack & Cody in 2005, which had three seasons (2005–2008).

Tisdale's breakthrough role came in the 2006 television movie High School Musical, which became Disney Channel's most-watched movie that year. The High School Musical series became a successful franchise which included the second television movie High School Musical 2 (2007), a feature film High School Musical 3: Senior Year (2008), and a spin-off movie Sharpay's Fabulous Adventure (2011). She has a main role in Phineas & Ferb (2007–2015), which became television's most-watched animated series among kids and tweens and had very positive reviews, and had guest appearances in Kim Possible (2007), Family Guy (2009), The Cleveland Show (2009), Glenn Martin, DDS (2009) and Fish Hooks (2009).

In 2010, Tisdale made her return to broadcast television. She had a leading role in the CW's series Hellcats (2010–2011) and minor roles in Sons of Anarchy (2012), Raising Hope (2012), Super Fun Night (2013) and The Crazy Ones (2013). In 2013, Tisdale starred in the feature film Scary Movie 5.

She has also worked as an executive producer in films and television shows, including Picture This (2008) and Sharpay's Fabulous Adventure (2011), a television reality show Miss Advised (2012) and the Disney Channel Original movie, Cloud 9 (2014), among other projects.

Film

As actress

As voice actress

Television

As an actress

As a voice actress

As herself

As a producer

Video games

As a voice actress

Notes

Footnotes

References

External links
 
 

Actress filmographies
Ashley Tisdale
American filmographies